James Henry Whittaker (1882–1949) was an English footballer who played in the Football League for Clapton Orient and Manchester City.

References

1882 births
1949 deaths
English footballers
Association football forwards
English Football League players
Footballers from Bolton